The Croatia women's national under-19 volleyball team represents Croatia in international women's volleyball competitions and friendly matches under the age 19 and it is ruled by the Croatian Volleyball Federation That is an affiliate of Federation of International Volleyball FIVB and also a part of European Volleyball Confederation CEV.

History

Results

Summer Youth Olympics
 Champions   Runners up   Third place   Fourth place

FIVB U19 World Championship
 Champions   Runners up   Third place   Fourth place

Europe U18 / U17 Championship
 Champions   Runners up   Third place   Fourth place

References

External links
Official website

National women's under-18 volleyball teams
W18
Volleyball in Croatia
Women's volleyball in Croatia